Theron Coleman Sapp, nicknamed Thundering Theron and the Drought-Breaker, (born June 15, 1935) is a former American football running back for the Philadelphia Eagles and Pittsburgh Steelers of the National Football League.  He attended the University of Georgia (UGA).

High school years
Sapp was born in Dublin, Georgia, and grew up in nearby Macon, attending that city's Lanier High School. As a High School senior, Sapp led his team to the 1953 state championship game but lost 9-6 to a Grady High School team from Atlanta coached by future Bulldogs assistant coach Erk Russell.

College years
After signing to play college football at UGA, Sapp fractured a vertebra in a diving accident in the Spring of 1954. After recovering from his injury that year, Sapp participated in spring practice in 1955 and participated on the B team that Fall.  In 1956, Sapp played on the Varsity team; however, another injury relegated him to reserve status.  In 1957, Sapp became the starting fullback and rushed 137 times for 599 yards and won All-SEC honors. In 1958, he was named the All-SEC fullback.

His performance in the 1957 Georgia-Georgia Tech game led to Sapp's nickname of Drought-Breaker.  Georgia Tech, UGA's fiercest rival at the time, had won the previous eight annual meetings between the two teams from 1949 to 1956, the longest winning streak in the series.  Playing defense as a back-up in the 3rd Quarter of the game, Sapp recovered a fumble by Tech's offense at midfield. On Georgia's ensuing offensive possession, Sapp carried the ball nine times including a one-yard touchdown carry on fourth and goal for the game's only score in a 7-0 UGA win.

Sapp's jersey, number 40, is one of four to be retired by UGA (the others being Frank Sinkwich, Charley Trippi and Herschel Walker).

Professional years
Sapp was drafted by the Philadelphia Eagles in the 10th round of the 1958 NFL Draft, and played running back for them through 1963.

References
 

1935 births
Living people
American football running backs
Georgia Bulldogs football players
Philadelphia Eagles players
Pittsburgh Steelers players
Sportspeople from Macon, Georgia
People from Dublin, Georgia
Players of American football from Georgia (U.S. state)